Several sets of codes and abbreviations are used to represent the political divisions of the United States for postal addresses, data processing, general abbreviations, and other purposes.

Table

This table includes abbreviations for three independent countries related to the United States through Compacts of Free Association, and other comparable postal abbreviations, including those now obsolete.

History
As early as October  1831, the United States Post Office recognized common abbreviations for states and territories. However, they accepted these abbreviations only because of their popularity, preferring that patrons spell names out in full to avoid confusion.

The traditional abbreviations for U.S. states and territories, widely used in mailing addresses prior to the introduction of two-letter U.S. postal abbreviations, are still commonly used for other purposes (such as legal citation), and are still recognized (though discouraged) by the Postal Service.

Modern two-letter abbreviated codes for the states and territories originated in October 1963, with the issuance of Publication 59: Abbreviations for Use with ZIP Code, three months after the Post Office introduced ZIP codes in July 1963. The purpose, rather than to standardize state abbreviations per se, was to make room in a line of no more than 23 characters for the city, the state, and the ZIP code.

Since 1963, only one state abbreviation has changed. Originally Nebraska was "NB"; but, in November 1969, the Post Office changed it to "NE" to avoid confusion with New Brunswick in Canada.

Prior to 1987, when the U.S. Secretary of Commerce approved the two-letter codes for use in government documents, the United States Government Printing Office (GPO) suggested its own set of abbreviations, with some states left unabbreviated. Today, the GPO supports United States Postal Service standard.

Current use of traditional abbreviations

Legal citation manuals, such as The Bluebook and The ALWD Citation Manual, typically use the "traditional abbreviations" or variants thereof.

Codes for states and territories

ISO standard 3166

ANSI standard INCITS 38:2009
The American National Standards Institute (ANSI) established alphabetic and numeric codes for each state and outlying areas in ANSI standard INCITS 38:2009. ANSI standard INCITS 38:2009 replaced the Federal Information Processing Standard (FIPS) standards FIPS 5-2, FIPS 6-4, and FIPS 10-4. The ANSI alphabetic state code is the same as the USPS state code except for U.S. Minor Outlying Islands, which have an ANSI code "UM" but no USPS code—and U.S. Military Mail locations, which have USPS codes ("AA", "AE", "AP") but no ANSI code.

Postal codes

The United States Postal Service (USPS) has established a set of uppercase abbreviations to help process mail with optical character recognition and other automated equipment. There are also official USPS abbreviations for other parts of the address, such as street designators (street, avenue, road, etc.).

These two-letter codes are distinguished from traditional abbreviations such as Calif., Fla., or Tex. The Associated Press Stylebook states that in contexts other than mailing addresses, the traditional state abbreviations should be used. However, the Chicago Manual of Style now recommends use of the uppercase two-letter abbreviations, with the traditional forms as an option.

The postal abbreviation is the same as the ISO 3166-2 subdivision code for each of the fifty states.

These codes do not overlap with the 13 Canadian subnational postal abbreviations. The code for Nebraska changed from NB to NE in November 1969 to avoid a conflict with New Brunswick. Canada likewise chose MB for Manitoba to prevent conflict with either Massachusetts (MA), Michigan (MI), Minnesota (MN), Missouri (MO), or Montana (MT).

Coast Guard vessel prefixes
The U.S. Coast Guard (USCG) uses a set of two-letter prefixes for vessel numbers; 39 states and the District of Columbia have the same USPS and USCG abbreviations. USCG prefixes have also been established for five outlying territories; all are the same as the USPS abbreviations except the Mariana Islands. The twelve cases where USPS and USCG abbreviations differ are listed below and marked in bold red in the table above, and do include three inland states with a small Coast Guard contingent. These twelve abbreviations were changed to avoid conflicting with the ISO 3166 two-digit country codes.

See also
 Australian abbreviation system
 Canadian abbreviation system
 ISO 3166-2:US
 United States Postal Service address formatting information

Notes

References

External links 
 USPS acronyms and abbreviations
 U.S. Census Bureau

Abbreviations
state and territory
Postal addresses in the United States